14th New York Film Critics Circle Awards
January 21, 1949(announced December 28, 1948)

The Treasureof the Sierra Madre
The 14th New York Film Critics Circle Awards, honored the best filmmaking of 1948.

Winners
Best Film:
The Treasure of the Sierra Madre
Best Actor:
Laurence Olivier - Hamlet
Best Actress:
Olivia de Havilland - The Snake Pit
Best Director:
John Huston - The Treasure of the Sierra Madre
Best Foreign Language Film:
Paisan (Paisà) • Italy

References

External links
1948 Awards

1948
New York Film Critics Circle Awards, 1948
1948 in American cinema
1948 in New York City